Ichnovirus is a genus of viruses, in the family Polydnaviridae. Parasitoid wasps serve as hosts, and these wasps are themselves parasitoids of Lepidoptera. There are 21 species in this genus.

Taxonomy
The genus contains the following 21 species:

Campoletis aprilis ichnovirus
Campoletis flavicincta ichnovirus
Campoletis sonorensis ichnovirus
Casinaria arjuna ichnovirus
Casinaria forcipata ichnovirus
Casinaria infesta ichnovirus
Diadegma acronyctae ichnovirus
Diadegma interruptum ichnovirus
Diadegma terebrans ichnovirus
Enytus montanus ichnovirus
Eriborus terebrans ichnovirus
Glypta fumiferanae ichnovirus
Hyposoter annulipes ichnovirus
Hyposoter exiguae ichnovirus
Hyposoter fugitivus ichnovirus
Hyposoter lymantriae ichnovirus
Hyposoter pilosulus ichnovirus
Hyposoter rivalis ichnovirus
Olesicampe benefactor ichnovirus
Olesicampe geniculatae ichnovirus
Synetaeris tenuifemur ichnovirus

Structure
Viruses in Ichnovirus are enveloped, with prolate ellipsoid and cylindrical geometries. Genomes are circular and segmented, around 6.0-20kb in length.

Life cycle
Viral replication is nuclear. DNA-templated transcription is the method of transcription. The virus exits the host cell by nuclear pore export.
Parasitoid wasps in the subfamilies Banchinae and Campopleginae serve as hosts, but these wasps are themselves parasites of lepidoptera. The wasp injects one or more eggs into its host along with a quantity of virus. The virus and wasp are in a symbiotic relationship: expression of viral genes prevents the wasp's host's immune system from killing the wasp's injected egg and causes other physiological alterations that ultimately cause the parasitized host to die. Transmission routes are parental.

References

External links
 Viralzone: Ichnovirus
 ICTV

Polydnaviridae
Virus genera